Septi Mende (born 21 September 1986) is a former Indonesian professional tennis player. She made her debut as a professional in October 2000, aged 14, at an ITF tournament in Jakarta.

In 2002 and 2003, she played in the Australian Open Junior Championships. In 2003, she and her partner Sandy Gumulya reached the quarterfinals of the Australian Open Junior Championships doubles competition.

She was part of Indonesia's Fed Cup team in 2006, but her only scheduled match was not played.

At the 2005 Southeast Asian Games, Mende won the silver medal in the women's doubles competitions, partnered by Ayu-Fani Damayanti.

In 2008, she reached the final of the Women's Doubles of the inaugural Garuda Indonesia Tennis Masters, partnered by Grace Sari Ysidora. They were defeated by Ayu-Fani Damayanti and Liza Andriyani.

At the 2011 Southeast Asian Games, Mende represented Indonesia in Soft tennis. She won two gold medals, for Mixed Doubles and for Women's Team.

ITF Circuit finals (10–6)

Singles: 1 (1–0)
{|
| valign=top align=left |

Doubles: 15 (9–6)

External links
 
 

Indonesian female tennis players
1986 births
Living people
Sportspeople from Jakarta
Minahasa people
Southeast Asian Games gold medalists for Indonesia
Southeast Asian Games silver medalists for Indonesia
Southeast Asian Games bronze medalists for Indonesia
Southeast Asian Games medalists in tennis
Competitors at the 2005 Southeast Asian Games
Competitors at the 2011 Southeast Asian Games
Southeast Asian Games medalists in soft tennis
21st-century Indonesian women